Paul Theron (born December 13, 1966) is the co-host of the Hot Stoxx show on CNBC Africa. He is also the founder and CEO of Vestact, a Johannesburg private client asset management firm.

Theron was named in 2013 as one of The 106 Finance People You Have To Follow On Twitter by Business Insider.

Theron grew up in Pretoria and graduated from Pretoria Boys High School in 1984. In that year he was both the Head Prefect and the Dux Scholar.

Theron holds a Master’s degree in Engineering (Energy Studies) from the University of Cape Town, having graduated in 1991.

Theron was also the founder of South Africa's first online stockbroker, Tradek, in 1996.

He is married to Marion Shaer and lives in Houghton, Johannesburg. Theron is an avid runner.

References

Living people
1966 births
CNBC people
University of Cape Town alumni